The members of the Triatominae , a subfamily of the Reduviidae, are also known as conenose bugs,  kissing bugs (so-called from their habit of feeding from around the mouths of people), or vampire bugs. Other local names for them used in the Americas include barbeiros, vinchucas, pitos, chipos and chinches. Most of the 130 or more species of this subfamily feed on vertebrate blood; a very few species feed on invertebrates. They are mainly found and widespread in the Americas, with a few species present in Asia and Africa. These bugs usually share shelter with nesting vertebrates, from which they suck blood.  In areas where Chagas disease occurs (from the southern United States to northern Argentina), all triatomine species are potential vectors of the Chagas disease parasite Trypanosoma cruzi, but only those species that are well adapted to living with humans (such as Triatoma infestans and Rhodnius prolixus) are considered important vectors. Also, proteins released from their bites have been known to induce anaphylaxis in sensitive and sensitized individuals.

History

At the beginning of the 19th century, Charles Darwin made one of the first reports of the existence of triatomines in America in his Journal and Remarks, published in 1839 and commonly known as The Voyage of the Beagle. The following is an extract which he based on his journal entry dated 26 March 1835:

Considerable medical speculation has occurred as to whether or not Darwin's contact with triatomines in Argentina was related to his later bouts of long-term illness, though it is unlikely to have been caused on this specific occasion, as he made no mention of the fever that usually follows the first infection.

Discovery of triatominae's relation with Chagas disease
In 1909, Brazilian doctor Carlos Chagas discovered that these insects were responsible for the transmission of T. cruzi to many of his patients in Lassance, a village located on the banks of the São Francisco River in Minas Gerais (Brazil).  Poor people living there complained of some insects they called barbeiros that bite during the night. Carlos Chagas put his first observations in words:

 Another Brazilian, Herman Lent, former student of Carlos Chagas, became devoted to the research of the triatomines and together with Peter Wygodzinsky made a revision of the Triatominae, a summary of 40 years of studies on the triatomines up to 1989.

Biological aspects

Lifecycle

Triatomines undergo incomplete metamorphosis. A wingless first-instar nymph hatches from an egg, and may be small as 2 mm. It passes successively through second, third, fourth, and fifth instars. Finally, the fifth instar turns into an adult, acquiring two pairs of wings.

Ecology
All triatomine nymph instars and adults are haematophagous and require the stability of a sheltered environment, where they aggregate.  Most species are associated with wild, nesting vertebrates and are named "sylvatic" triatomines.  These live in ground burrows with rodents or armadillos, or in tree dwellings with bats, birds, sloths, or opossums. Few species (5%) live in human dwellings or in the surroundings of human houses (peridomicile) in the shelters of domestic animals, these are named "domestic" species.  Many sylvatic species are in process of domiciliation (i.e. "semidomestic").

Behavior
Most triatomines aggregate in refuges during day and search for blood during night, when the host is asleep and the air is cooler. Odors and heat guide these insects to their hosts. Carbon dioxide emanating from breath, as well as ammonia, short-chain amines, and carboxylic acids from skin, hair, and exocrine glands from vertebrate animals, are among the volatiles that attract triatomines. Vision also serves triatomines for orientation.  At night, adults of diverse species fly to houses attracted by light.

Adults produce a pungent odor (isobutyric acid) when disturbed, and are also capable of producing a particular sound by rubbing the rostrum over a stridulatory sulcus under its head (stridulation).

Epidemiology 
Domestic and sylvatic species can carry the Chagas parasite to humans and wild mammals; birds are immune to the parasite. T. cruzi transmission is carried mainly from human to human by domestic kissing bugs; from the vertebrate to the bug by blood, and from the bug to the vertebrate by the insect's feces, and not by its saliva as occurs in most bloodsucking arthropod vectors such as malaria mosquitoes.

Triatomine infestation especially affects older dwellings. One can recognize the presence of triatomines in a house by its feces, exuviae, eggs, and adults. Triatomines characteristically leave two kinds of feces like strikes on walls of infected houses; one is white with uric acid, and the other is dark (black) containing heme. Whitish or pinkish eggs can be seen in wall crevices. After having had a blood meal, the insects sometimes show a limited mobility and can be identified easily.

Controlling triatomine infestations

Insecticide treatment
Synthetic pyrethroids are the main class of insecticides used to control triatominae infestations. Insecticide treatment is more effective on nonporous surfaces, such as hardwood timber, fired bricks, and plastered walls, than on porous surfaces such as mud. A single treatment with insecticide  typically protects against triatomine infestation for a year or more on timber walls vs. 2–3 months on adobe walls. Wettable powders, suspension concentrates, and insecticide paints can improve treatment effectiveness on porous surfaces.

Rates of insecticide resistance among triatomines are fairly low due to their long lifecycle and low genetic variability, but some instances of resistance have been reported, particularly among Triatoma infestans populations in Bolivia and Argentina.

Tribes, genera, and numbers of described species 
The monophyletic nature of the Triatominae subfamily is strongly supported by molecular data, indicating that their blood-sucking character has occurred only once within the Reduviidae.
The classification within the subfamily is not stable, with different proposed relationships among the tribes and genera. The classification below largely follows Galvão et al. 2003, but in 2009 this same author eliminated the tribe Linshcosteini and also eliminated the genera Meccus, Mepraia, and Nesotriatoma
 †Paleotriatoma Burmese amber, Myanmar, Late Cretaceous (Cenomanian)
Alberproseniini (monotypic)
 Alberprosenia 2

Bolboderini
 Belminus 9
 Bolbodera 1
 Microtriatoma 2
 Parabelminus 2
Cavernicolini (monotypic)
 Cavernicola 2
Linshcosteini
 Linshcosteus Distant, 1904 (6)

Rhodniini
 Psammolestes 3
 Rhodnius 16

Triatomini
 Dipetalogaster 1
 Eratyrus 2
 Hermanlentia 1
 Meccus 6
 Mepraia 2
 Nesotriatoma 3
 Panstrongylus 13
 Paratriatoma 1
 Triatoma 67

Most important vectors 
All 138 Triatominae species are potentially able to transmit T. cruzi to humans, but these five species are the most epidemiologically important vectors of Chagas disease.
 Triatoma infestans
 Rhodnius prolixus
 Triatoma dimidiata
 Triatoma brasiliensis
 Panstrongylus megistus

See also 
 Hematophagy

References

Further reading
 Brenner RR, Stoka AM (1987) Chagas’ disease vectors. I, II and III. CRC Press. Boca Ratón
 Dujardin JP, Schofield CJ, Panzera F (2000) "Les vecteurs de la maladie de Chagas: recherches taxonomiques, biologiques et génétiques". Academie Royale des Sciences d'Ultre-Mer. Belgium.

External links 

 The Kiss of Death: Chagas' Disease in the Americas
 

Insect vectors of human pathogens
Reduviidae
Hemiptera subfamilies
Hematophages